Jane Taylor (born 19 April 1956) is a South African writer, playwright and academic.
She currently holds the Andrew W. Mellon Chair of Aesthetic Theory and Material Performance at the Centre for Humanities Research at the University of the Western Cape in South Africa. She is the director of the Laboratory of Kinetic Objects (LoKO), a Centre for the theoretical and material exploration of the Subject/Object continuum. The Centre engages in performance arts as well as research and intellectual enquiry into the human and technological interface, Artificial Intelligence (AI) Intelligent Amplification (IA). Her recent performance/lecture “Ne’er So Much the Ape” [which takes its title from an old English adage, ‘ne’er so much the Ape as when he wears the doctor’s cape’] explores the articulation of primate research, race theory, AI, and performance theory.

In 1987, she and David Bunn co-edited From South Africa (University of Chicago Press), an anthology which documents the Years of Emergency in the last decade of Apartheid in that country, through new photography, graphics, literature. In 1994, she and David Bunn curated the exhibition "Displacements" at the Block Gallery, Northwestern University, Illinois. In 1996, she curated "Fault Lines," an exhibition at Cape Town Castle on truth and reconciliation. "Fault Lines" was also, more broadly, a series of cultural responses which she initiated in order to draw artists from the international community into exploring the discourses and practices of Truth and Reconciliation. She has written about Jarry's Pere Ubu  and she also wrote the playtext of "Ubu and the Truth Commission" with artist/director William Kentridge and Handspring Puppet Company.

In 2001, she wrote the libretto for The Confessions of Zeno for Kentridge and Handspring. She has recently edited Handspring Puppet Company (David Krut publishers, 2009), a substantial study of this world-renowned South African performance troupe.

Taylor was a co-editor of Refiguring the Archive, a volume which surveyed the field of archive fever in the last decade (Kluwer Academic Press); and curated the exhibition, "Holdings", which engaged with the question of value, the archive and memory.

She received the prestigious Olive Schreiner Prize for new fiction for her Of Wild Dogs in 2006.

In 2009, she published The Transplant Men, a novel that examines the life of the South African heart surgeon, Chris Barnard. She has been a visiting fellow at the University of Chicago and at Oxford and Cambridge Universities as well as a Rockefeller Fellow at Emory University, Atlanta.

She has received Fellowships from Mellon and Rockefeller, and has been a visiting professor at Oxford and at Cambridge. From 2000 to 2009, she was the Skye Chair of Dramatic Arts at the University of the Witwatersrand. In Fall 2011, she was Writer-in-Residence at Northwestern University. For several years she was a periodic Visiting Professor at the University of Chicago.

The Renaissance scholar Stephen Greenblatt commissioned Taylor as one of a dozen playwrights to make a version of "Cardenio", a play allegedly written originally by Shakespeare, and that has disappeared leaving nothing but the name of the work. Her production, "After Cardenio" opened in Cape Town in August 2011. It is a work of avant garde puppet theatre, which works with a vellum puppet made by South African sculptor Gavin Younge.

She was an advisor for dOCUMENTA 2012. She and medievalist David Nirenberg exchanged a series of letters as one of the published notebooks (online at www3.documenta.de/uploads/tx_publications/103_Taylor-Nirenberg.pdf) for dOcumenta.
From 2013-2016, she held the Wole Soyinka Chair of Theatre at the University of Leeds. In 2016, she was Visiting Avenali Chair of the Humanities at University of California, Berkeley.
In 2017, she published Being Led By the Nose (University of Chicago), a study of the artist/director William Kentridge’s production of Shostakovitch’s opera for the New York Metropolitan Opera. 
She has an abiding interest in the History and Theory of the performance of sincerity and has explored this question with regard to the histories of performance, the law, and theology.

References

External links

 Book Southern Africa Page

1956 births
Living people
South African women novelists
South African dramatists and playwrights
Writers from Cape Town
Women dramatists and playwrights